Elihu "Buddy" Allen, Jr. (born July 11, 1937 in St. Louis, Missouri) is a former professional American football halfback in the American Football League. He played college football at Utah State University, and played professionally for the Denver Broncos in 1961.
In 1962, Allen joined the Cleveland Bulldogs of the United Football League, where he became an All Star. In 1965, the team moved to Philadelphia and joined the Continental Football League. In 1966, the Philadelphia Bulldogs won the CFL title. In 1968, Allen joined the Pottstown Firebirds of the Atlantic Coast Football League, where he concluded his career. Allen was also a detective for the Philadelphia police department.

See also
List of American Football League players

External links
Stats

1937 births
Living people
Players of American football from St. Louis
American football halfbacks
Utah State Aggies football players
Denver Broncos (AFL) players
United Football League (1961–1964) players
Philadelphia Bulldogs players
Atlantic Coast Football League players
American police detectives